Barnby Dun is a village in Doncaster, South Yorkshire, England. Together with Kirk Sandall it forms the civil parish of Barnby Dun with Kirk Sandall. It lies between Arksey and Stainforth. It is located about 4 miles north-east of Doncaster town centre.

Barnby Dun has a long history and was mentioned in the Domesday Book of 1086. The village has a church dedicated to St Peter and St Paul, which dates back to the 12th century. It is a former mining village and its history is closely tied to the coal mining industry. Today, Barnby Dun is a residential area with a mix of modern and older properties.

There are local shops, a primary school, and recreational facilities, such as a village hall and playing fields, in the area. The village is known for its friendly community and good transport links to nearby towns and cities, making it a popular choice for families and commuters.

The parish church of St Peter & St Paul is Grade I listed.

Transport
Boats are used on the canal and River Don. Barnby Dun railway station operated here until its closure. Kirk Sandall railway station still operates close by.

Education
Barnby Dun Primary School is here. Arksey School is in the neighbouring village of Arksey.

See also
Listed buildings in Barnby Dun with Kirk Sandall

References

Villages in Doncaster